Down to the Wire may refer to:

Books
Down to the Wire: UPI's Fight for Survival by Gregory Gordon and Ronald E. Cohen about United Press International

Music
 "Down to the Wire", a song on the album Decade by Neil Young
 "Down to the Wire", a song on the album Demoz by Marcella Detroit
 "Down to the Wire", a song on the album Far from Over by Vijay Iyer
 "Down to the Wire", a song on the album Greatest Hints by Michael Stanley Band
 "Down to the Wire", a song on the album Inside Out by Fates Warning
 "Down to the Wire", a song on the album Light of the Fearless by Hybrid
 "Down to the Wire", a song on the album Oceanview Motel by Mae Moore
 "Down to the Wire", a song on the compilation album Rarities by The Living End
 "Down to the Wire", a song on the album Red Earth by Crash Vegas
 "Down to the Wire", a song on the album Resilient by Running Wild
 "Down to the Wire", a song on the album Stop the World by Ghost Dance
 "Down to the Wire", a song on the album The Grapes of Wrath by The Grapes of Wrath
 "Down to the Wire", a song on the album Under the Gun by Poco
 Down to the Wire, an album by Paul Peterson
 Down to the Wire: 4th Ave Edition, an album by Mozzy

Television
 "Down to the Wire", an episode in season 2 of Airline
 "Down to the Wire", an episode in season 6 of CSI: Miami
 "Down to the Wire", an episode in season 1 of Jade Fever
 "Down to the Wire", an episode in season 1 of The Apprentice
 "Down to the Wire", an episode in season 14 of The Biggest Loser
 "Down to the Wire", an episode in season 16 of The Challenge
 "Down to the Wire", an episode in season 2 of Top Shot